This list of archaeological sites in Taiwan encompasses sites that have either contributed substantially or have the potential to contribute substantially to research regarding people who have lived in Taiwan since prehistoric times. A historical site is not necessarily an archaeological site. A historical site should be included only if actual field work has been conducted at the site.

Northern Taiwan

Metropolitan Taipei 
 Botanical Garden Site (植物園遺址)
 Chihshan Rock Site (芝山岩遺址)
 Shihsanhang Site (十三行遺址)
 Tapenkeng Site (大坌坑遺址)
 Yuanshan Site (圓山遺址)

Central Taiwan

Taichung 
 Fanchi Garden Site (番仔園遺址)
 Huilai Monument Archaeology Park
 Niumatou Site

Nantou 
 Chuping Archaeological Site

Southern Taiwan

Kaohsiung 
 Fengbitou Archaeological Site
 Futingchin Site (覆鼎金遺址)
 Hoching Site (後勁遺址)
 Hochuang Site (後庄遺址)
 Liuho Site (六和遺址)
 Lungchuan Temple Site (龍泉寺遺址)
 Tsoying Old City Site (左營舊城遺址)

Tainan 
 Niaosung Culture Site 
 歸仁窯遺址
 南科遺址
 西寮遺址
 道爺南糖廍遺址

Eastern Taiwan

Taitung 
 八仙洞遺址
 Donghe Site (東河遺址)
 Beinan Site
 Dulan Site

Yilan 
 宜蘭農校遺址
 淇武蘭遺址
 大竹圍遺址
 Wanshan Site (丸山遺址)

Outlying islands

Kinmen 
 Chinkuishan Site 金龜山遺址

See also 

 
Taiwan
archaeological sites
archaeological sites